Sargassum siliquastrum is a brown alga species in the genus Sargassum.

Sargachromanols are bio-active isolates of S. siliquastrum. It has anti-inflammatory effect.

See also 
 List of Sargassum species

References

External links

Fucales
Species described in 1820